Newstead is an inner northern riverside suburb of Brisbane, Queensland, Australia.

Geography

The northern and western parts of the suburb, centred on Breakfast Creek Road, is predominantly commercial, with the remainder, particularly near the river, becoming increasingly residential.

History

The suburb takes its name from Newstead House, built and named in 1846 by pioneer grazier Patrick Leslie, which in turn takes its name from Newstead Abbey in Nottinghamshire, England.

The suburb's present role as an up-market residential suburb belies its industrial past. Timber yards, asbestos works, wharves and woolstores once dominated the eastern side of the suburb. The tall iron structure of the No. 2 gasholder on Skyring Terrace is a remnant of the Newstead Gasworks, which was established in 1887 as Brisbane's second gas works. The structure, however, was originally located at the Petrie Bight gasworks, where it was erected in 1873.

The suburb was served by first horse drawn trams from 1885.  From 1897 electric trams ran along Commercial Road (until December 1962) and along Ann and Wickham Streets until April 1969.  Light Street tram and bus depot was located in the suburb.  It opened as a tram depot in 1885, saw its last trams in December 1968 and finally closed as a bus depot in the mid 1990s, making it one of Queensland's longest continually operating industrial sites.  All traces of the depot and its heritage have been obliterated and the site redeveloped, although a remnant of its trackwork – a unique three way set of points – has been preserved at the Brisbane Tramway Museum.

In 1888 the Booroodabin Bowls Club was established, making it the oldest bowls club still operating in Queensland. At that time, the club was within the local government area of Booroodabin Division, which was established in 1879 and amalgamated into the Town of Brisbane in 1903. The club's name presumably reflects the local government area. The name Booroodabin is an Aboriginal word meaning place of the she-oaks.

Breakfast Creek State School opened on 7 July 1890 and closed on 11 August 1961.  It was on the western side of Agnes Street (now in Albion). Following the closure of the school, the Fortitude Valley Opportunity School relocated into the buildings, becoming Newstead Opportunity School. Later it was renamed Newstead Special School. It closed in 1996.

The suburb was served by the Bulimba Branch railway line, which branched off the main north coast line at Bowen Hills and descended towards the river and Breakfast Creek Road, crossing it to reach the industry, wool stores and wharves along the river. The line opened on 16 December 1897 and closed on 31 March 1990. Some remnants of the rail line have been preserved in the wool stores precinct. The name Bulimba reflects historic use of this name for both sides of the Bulimba Reach of the Brisbane River, but today it refers only to the suburb on the south side of the reach.

Newstead Park contains the Australian American Memorial which commemorates the United States of America's contribution to defending Australia during World War II, when General Douglas MacArthur based his headquarters in Brisbane. The foundation stone of the memorial was laid on 3 May 1951 during Coral Sea week (the Battle of the Coral Sea was fought from 4 to 8 May 1942). The completed memorial was unveiled on 3 May 1952 by Sir John Lavarack, then the Governor of Queensland.

Demographics

The median age of the Newstead population was 36 years of age, 1 year below the Australian median. Children aged under 15 years made up 4.2% of the population and people aged 65 years and over made up 16.5% of the population. 67.8% of people living in Newstead were born in Australia, compared to the national average of 69.8%. The other top responses for country of birth were England 4.4%, New Zealand 3.8%, United States of America 1.9%, South Africa 1.3%, Saudi Arabia 1.1%. 81.6% of people spoke only English at home; the next most popular languages were 1.4% Cantonese, 1.4% Arabic, 0.8% Persian (excluding Dari), 0.8% Italian, 0.8% Spanish. The most common responses for religion in Newstead were No Religion 27.9%, Catholic 25.4%, Anglican 18.4%, Uniting Church 6.6%, and Presbyterian and Reformed 3.1%.

The  median age of was 35 years of age, two years below the Queensland median and three years below the Australian median. 55.4% of residents were born in Australia, around 15% less than Queensland and around 11% less than all Australia. 26.4% of residents had tertiary or university institution education, versus 14.8% for Queensland and 16.1% for all Australia. ~56% of residents indicated "No Religion" or "not stated" versus ~39% for both Queensland and Australia populations. ~76% of residents (over 15 years old and in work force) were working full-time, compared with ~58% for both Queensland and Australia populations.

Heritage listings 
Newstead has a number of heritage-listed sites, including:

 96 Breakfast Creek Road: former Police Station
 108 Breakfast Creek Road: former Brasch's Service Station (also known as Pirie Grey Fegan's service station, U.S. Navy Service Station)
 126 Breakfast Creek Road: Booroodabin Bowls Club
 161 Breakfast Creek Road: Primary Industries Dept Office (also known as Hornibrook House, M.R. Hornibrook (Pty) Limited building)
 Adjacent 194 Breakfast Creek Road: Remnants of the second Breakfast Creek Bridge (South)
 199 Breakfast Creek Road : Newstead House
 4 Commercial Road: Waterloo Hotel
 22 Kyabra Street: Victorian-era Queenslander houset
 33 Longland Street: former Wilcox Mofflin Ltd
 14 Maud Street: former Australian Boot Factory (also known as Federal Boot Company)
 40 Newstead Terrace: Victorian-era Queenslander house
 Road Reserve Commercial Road, now in Teneriffe: Newstead Air Raid Shelter
 35 Ross Street: Substation No.47
 82 Skyring Terrace, now in Teneriffe: Newstead Gasworks

Education 
There are no schools in Newstead. The nearest primary schools are New Farm State School in New Farm and Ascot State School in Ascot. The nearest secondary school is Fortitude Valley State Secondary College in Fortitude Valley, but, having opened in 2020 with Year 7 only, will not offer all years of secondary schooling until 2025. Other years of secondary schooling are available at Kelvin Grove State College in Kelvin Grove and Kedron State High School in Kedron.

Amenities 

Booroodabin Bowls Club (nicknamed "The Boo") is on the corner of Breakfast Creek Road and Edmonstone Street.
The Gasworks Newstead retail precinct includes restaurants, cafes, shops, a supermarket, and a public plaza inside the old gas holder of the heritage-listed Newstead Gasworks.

Pride of the suburb is Newstead House, Brisbane's oldest existing home, built for pioneer Darling Downs squatter Patrick Leslie in 1846. It is set in superb grounds overlooking the mouth of the creek and is within easy walking distance of the famed Breakfast Creek Hotel – a flamboyant Victorian structure which has been described as 'the very soul of Brisbane'. Newstead House's glory days came during the time of the residence of Captain John Clements Wickham, the official resident and magistrate of the Moreton Bay settlement and a noted and gracious host. While an admission fee must be paid to visit the house, the gardens (now Newstead Park) are a public park.

Transport
Brisbane Transport continues to serve the suburb by bus. A cross river ferry, also operated by Brisbane Transport, links the suburb to Bulimba from the nearby Teneriffe ferry wharf. The suburb is also linked to the city by "CityCat" catamaran ferry service.

References

External links

 
 
 

Suburbs of the City of Brisbane